Kim Yeong-gi (born 7 January 1936) is a South Korean basketball player. He competed in the men's tournament at the 1956 Summer Olympics and the 1964 Summer Olympics.

In 1958 he was in mandatory military service and played for the Republic of Korea Air Force team in domestic competition. He also represented South Korea internationally at the Asian Games that year in Tokyo. His son  made his professional basketball debut in 1991. In 1993 he was named a vice-president of the Korea Basketball Association. In 2006 he was promoted from vice-president to president of the Korean Basketball League. He received the 14th Sogang Athletics Grand Award in 2022.

References

External links
 

1936 births
Living people
South Korean men's basketball players
Olympic basketball players of South Korea
Basketball players at the 1956 Summer Olympics
Basketball players at the 1964 Summer Olympics
Place of birth missing (living people)
Asian Games medalists in basketball
Asian Games bronze medalists for South Korea
Basketball players at the 1962 Asian Games
Medalists at the 1962 Asian Games